Heteronyx is a genus of beetles in the family Melolonthidae found in Australia, Melanesia and South America.

Over three hundred species have been described in the genus Heteronyx including:
 Heteronyx queenlandicus

References 

Melolonthinae